AIDS Drug Assistance Programs are a set of programs in all 50-states in the United States that provide Food and Drug Administration-approved HIV treatment drugs to low income patients in the U.S.

The programs are administered by each state with funds distributed by the United States government.

In June 2007 the program provided coverage for 102,000 or 30% of those infected with HIV in the United States.  Drug expenditures were $100.1 million in 2007 and $8.8 million in money spent on helping with insurance payments. This represented 344,600 prescriptions.

The total program budget is $1.4 Billion with California receiving $288 Million, New York $241 Million, Texas $101 Million, and Florida $97 Million.

The program first began in 1987 with appropriations to help pay for AZT.  The program was expanded in 1990 with the Ryan White Comprehensive AIDS Resources Emergency (CARE) Act (commonly referred to as the Ryan White Care Act.

Most recipients are below 200% of the Federal Poverty Level (FPL) and 43 percent are below 100% the FPL.  63% are black or hispanic  and 77% are male.

In 2010, some states, citing budgetary reasons began cutbacks to the ADAP Formulary or instituted waiting lists for medication. A controversial dialogue began in states like Florida as to how these cutbacks would affect lower income persons with HIV and whether the lack of funds should be blamed on the federal government or the state legislatures.

Client Eligibility 
Client eligibility is determined by the state and territory and includes financial and medical eligibility criteria. Financial eligibility is usually determined as a percentage of the Federal Poverty Level. Medical eligibility is a diagnosis of HIV.
 Clients must provide proof of current state residency.
 ADAPs are required to recertify client eligibility every six months and must meet HRSA's minimum requirements for recertification.

References

External links
 Access Project Listing of ADAP Programs in Each State
 List of Recent Articles Mentioning AIDS Drug Assistance Programs in SFGN Newspaper
 https://hab.hrsa.gov/about-ryan-white-hivaids-program/part-b-aids-drug-assistance-program
 Patient Assistance Program

HIV/AIDS in the United States